Gene "Sodie" Davidson (February 19, 1896 – September 12, 1960) was an American football and baseball player for the Arkansas Razorbacks of the University of Arkansas. He was inducted into the Arkansas Sports Hall of Fame in 1968. Davidson was named "Arkansas' Greatest Athlete" in 1919.

Early years
Gene Davidson was born on February 19, 1896, in Hon Township of Scott County, Arkansas to Joe Davidson and Susan Ivey.

References

1896 births
1960 deaths
Arkansas Razorbacks baseball players
Arkansas Razorbacks football players
Arkansas Razorbacks men's basketball players
All-Southern college football players
Players of American football from Arkansas
Baseball players from Arkansas
Fort Smith Twins players
People from Scott County, Arkansas
American football quarterbacks
American men's basketball players